Neocollyris rugosior is a species of ground beetle in the genus Neocollyris in the subfamily Carabinae. It was described by Horn in 1896.

References

Rugosior, Neocollyris
Beetles described in 1896